Neblinichthys pilosus is a species of armored catfish endemic to Venezuela where it is found in the upper Negro, Casiquiare and Baria River basins. This species grows to a length of  SL.

References

Ancistrini
Mammals of Venezuela
Endemic fauna of Venezuela
Fish described in 1986